is a retired Japanese judoka, and former world champion. His younger brothers, Yukimasa and Kenzo are also former world champions.

Nakamura is from Fukuoka, Fukuoka. He began Judo at the age of 3rd grader. After graduation from Tokai University, He belonged to Asahi Kasei.

He won the gold medal in the -86 kg weight class at the 1993 World Judo Championships.

In 1995, after All-Japan Championships, he moved up in weight class, from -86 kg to -95 kg.

He finished in seventh place in the -95 kg weight class at the Olympic Games in 1996 and won the bronze medal in the -95 kg weight class at the World Championships in 1997.

Nakamura was good at Uchimata, Ōuchi gari, Harai goshi and especially Newaza. He is well known that he destroyed Hirotaka Okada's elbow by Juji-gatame at the All-Japan selected championships in 1994. He was also known as a rival of Hidehiko Yoshida.

In July 2004, after All-Japan Businessgroup Championships, Nakamura retired.

As of 2010, he has coached at Asahi Kasei since 2001. Among his pupil are world champion Hiroshi Izumi, Masato Uchishiba and so on.

References

External links
 

1970 births
Living people
Tokai University alumni
Japanese male judoka
Judoka at the 1996 Summer Olympics
Olympic judoka of Japan
Asian Games medalists in judo
Judoka at the 1994 Asian Games
Judoka at the 1998 Asian Games
Asian Games gold medalists for Japan
Asian Games silver medalists for Japan
Sportspeople from Fukuoka (city)
Medalists at the 1994 Asian Games
Medalists at the 1998 Asian Games
20th-century Japanese people